Azilia affinis is a species of long-jawed orb weaver in the family of spiders known as Tetragnathidae. It is found in a range from the United States to Panama.

References

Tetragnathidae
Articles created by Qbugbot
Spiders described in 1893